Svetlana Tsidikova (born 4 February 1985) is a Russian former football midfielder. She previously played for Nadezhda Noginsk, WFC Rossiyanka, FC Khimki and Energiya Voronezh, also playing the European Cup with Rossiyanka.

She has been a member of the Russian national team, taking part in the 2009 European Championship. As an under-19 international she played the 2004 U-19 World Championship.

References

1985 births
Living people
Russian women's footballers
Russia women's international footballers
Nadezhda Noginsk players
WFC Rossiyanka players
FC Energy Voronezh players
CSP Izmailovo players
Women's association football midfielders
21st-century Russian women
Russian Women's Football Championship players